Braham Stevens (born 1969) is an Australian sculptor whose work is influenced by the intricate patterns found in nature and science.

He is known for his large-scale National works of public art that are conceived to engage with their environments and surroundings, such as Embrace Cairns performing arts precinct, Reflection at James Cook University, Drift  Wellington Point Brisbane, Into the Blue City of Rockingham Foreshore, Western Australia, Guulbughul Reconciliation Rocks Cape York and Eye on the Horizon at Port Kembla, Headland Wollongong.

Early Life / Education
After the early death of his father, Stevens started creating art with found materials in the natural environment as an escape from the hardship, poverty and social stigma. A youth spent working as a labourer on the large cattle, wheat and sheep stations along the Murray River reinforced this connection with the environment. The repetitive manual nature of the work likened by the artist to the sustained hands-on physicality and meditative process of stone and metal sculpture.

In his early years he regularly attended life drawing and portraiture classes at Albury College, later studying Industrial and Applied Arts and Metal Smithing at Melbourne Technical College.

Relocating to Europe and London in the early 1980s, Stevens was an active participant in the vibrant Carnaby Street art and music, collective subculture. 

Initially creating ephemeral art with found natural materials - including mudlarking on the River Thames - Stevens started experimenting with stone, recycled metal and alloy in the late 80s, developing techniques and processes to make more permanent durable structures that could withstand time and the elements.

Career - major public artwork commissions

Stevens' most prominent public works include:

 EMBRACE & REFLECTION - In 2016 Stevens was commissioned by the City of Cairns to create a 9m and 5m high linking public art installation that celebrated the ongoing interrelationship between James Cook University and the City
 DRIFT - Sand, Sea & Sky - In 2018 Stevens’ Abstract Triptych Concept based on Stingrays won the national competition for the gateway commission to Stradbroke Island Brisbane.
 INTO THE BLUE - In 2019 Stevens was commissioned to create an iconic foreshore precinct sculpture for the City of Rockingham Western Australia. It was modelled on an eagle ray, prominently positioned and 6m high
 GUULBUGHUL (all together) - In late 2020 Stevens was commissioned by the Bama-ngay Traditional Custodians and Elders to create a Landmark Installation for the Heritage Listed Reconciliation Rocks Cultural Precinct in Cape York Far North Queensland. His collaboration with LA3 landscape architects being awarded the Landscape Institute of Architects Australia best cultural project in 2022

 EYE ON THE HORIZON - In mid 2021 Stevens was awarded a national commission from the Federal Government to design a landmark World War II commemorative artwork for the City of Wollongong NSW.

References 

Living people
20th-century Australian sculptors
21st-century Australian sculptors